Bagmore is a village in Hampshire, England.

Villages in Hampshire